American country music singer Carrie Underwood has released nine studio albums, one greatest hits album, and 29 singles. Underwood rose to fame after winning the fourth season of American Idol in 2005. Her debut album, Some Hearts, was released in 2005 and is the fastest-selling debut country album in Nielsen SoundScan history. It also became the best-selling solo female country debut in Recording Industry Association of America (RIAA) history, as well as the top-selling debut album of any American Idol contestant in the United States.

Her second album, Carnival Ride, was released in 2007 and debuted at number one on the Billboard 200 charts. During the first week, it sold 527,000 copies, which at the time was the best sales week by a female solo country artist since Shania Twain's Greatest Hits sold 530,000 copies in its first week back in 2004. The album has since been certified 4× Platinum.

Underwood released her third studio album, Play On, on November 3, 2009. It debuted at number one on the Top Country Albums chart and the all-genre Billboard 200. It features the number one singles "Cowboy Casanova", "Temporary Home", and "Undo It", as well as the number two single, "Mama's Song". The album has since been certified 3× Platinum in the US, Platinum in Canada, and Gold in Australia. In June 2011, the album re-entered the Australian Albums Chart for both the ARIA National Top 50 and the Country Top 20 albums at number 14 and number one, respectively, giving Underwood her first number one album in Australia. The album was eventually certified Gold in Australia.

On May 1, 2012, Underwood released her fourth album, Blown Away. In the United States, it sold 267,000 albums in its first week and debuted at number one on the Billboard 200 and the Top Country Albums charts. It debuted at number one in Canada's Top 200 all-genre albums chart and Top 100 Country albums chart, being immediately certified Gold. The album also debuted at number one on Australia's Top 20 Country Albums and number four on the all-genre Top 50 Albums. The album has been certified 2× Platinum in the United States and Canada.

On December 9, 2014, Underwood released her first greatest hits album, Greatest Hits: Decade #1. The compilation debuted at number four on the Billboard 200 and at number one on the Top Country Albums charts, and set several records upon release, including having the biggest sales debut for a hits collection in any genre of music in more than six years and the biggest first-week sales for a female hits album in any genre in over nine years. The album was certified Platinum by the RIAA on January 16, 2015.

Underwood's fifth studio album, Storyteller was released on October 23, 2015. The album debuted at number 2 on the Billboard 200. This made Underwood the only country artist to have his or her first five studio albums debut at number one or number two on the Billboard 200 chart. It also debuted atop the Top Country Albums chart, earning Underwood another record as the only artist to score six consecutive number one albums on that chart. The album was certified Platinum by the RIAA on October 24, 2016.

Underwood released her sixth studio album, Cry Pretty, on September 14, 2018. The album debuted at number one on the Billboard 200 chart, making Underwood the first woman to have four number one country albums on that chart. It sold 266,000 album-equivalent units in its first week, out of which 251,000 copies were pure sales, giving Underwood the largest sales week for a female artist in 2018.

On September 25, 2020, Underwood released her seventh studio album and first Christmas album, My Gift. The album debuted at number one on the Billboard Top Christian Albums chart, Top Holiday Albums chart and Top Country Albums chart, setting the record as the first artist to score eight consecutive number one debuts on the latter chart. The album debuted at number eight on the Billboard 200 albums chart with 43,000 units and later peaked at number five.

In the United States, Underwood remains the best-selling album artist from American Idol franchise with a total of 16.3 million albums sold. She is the top country artist and the fifth highest-certified female artist on the RIAA Top Artists (Digital Singles) Ranking. She is also the fourth biggest album seller among artists who have debuted the past 13 years. Underwood has accumulated over 85 Billboard number-ones. She has had 16 singles top the Billboard Country Airplay, and 14 singles top the Hot Country Songs. Underwood has the longest streak of top 10 promoted singles from a career's start on the Hot Country Songs chart at 27.

Albums

Studio albums

Compilation albums

Video albums

Singles

As lead artist

As featured artist

Promotional singles

Other charted songs

Other album appearances

Music videos

Short form

Long form

Notes

References

External links

American Idol discographies
Discography
Country music discographies
Discographies of American artists